A holarchy is a connection between holons, where a holon is both a part and a whole. The term was coined in Arthur Koestler's 1967 book The Ghost in the Machine.

Holarchy is commonly referred to as a form of hierarchy; however, hierarchy, by its definition, has both an absolute top and bottom.  But this is not logically possible in a holon, as it is both a whole and a part.  The "hierarchical relationship" between holons at different levels can just as meaningfully be described with terms like "in and out", as they can with "up and down" or "left and right"; perhaps more generally, one can say that holons at one level are "made up of, or make up" the holons or parts of another level. This can be demonstrated in the holarchic relationship (subatomic particles ↔ atoms ↔ molecules ↔ macromolecules ↔ organelles ↔ cells ↔ tissues ↔ organs ↔ organisms ↔ communities ↔ societies) where each holon is a "level" of organization, and all are ultimately descriptive of the same set (e.g., a particular collection of matter). The top can be a bottom, a bottom can be a top, and, like a fractal, the patterns evident at one level can be similar to those at another.

Different meanings

David Spangler uses the term in a different meaning: "In a hierarchy, participants can be compared and evaluated on the basis of position, rank, relative power, seniority, and the like. But in a holarchy each person’s value comes from his or her individuality and uniqueness and the capacity to engage and interact with others to make the fruits of that uniqueness available."

In multiagent systems 

Multiagent systems are systems composed of autonomous software entities. They are able to simulate a system or to solve problems. A holarchy may be easily mapped to a hierarchy of agents in which an agent is composed of agents, and may have its own behavior defined as a partial consequence of these parts' behaviors.

See also 
 Gestalt
 Heterarchy
 Holism
 Ecological anthropology
 Martinus Thomsen's cosmology
 Modular design
 Nihilism
 Noosphere
 Ontology modularization
 Polytely
 Process philosophy
 Sacred geometry
 Holacracy

References

External links
 Brief essay on holarchies

Networks
Holism